The 1955 North Carolina Tar Heels football team represented the University of North Carolina at Chapel Hill during the 1955 college football season. The Tar Heels were led by third-year head coach George T. Barclay, and played their home games at Kenan Memorial Stadium. The team competed as a member of the Atlantic Coast Conference, finishing in fifth. 

Following the conclusion of the season, Barclay's coaching contract expired and was not renewed by UNC. He did not produce a winning season in his three years as head coach, finishing with an overall record of 11–18–1.

Schedule

References

North Carolina
North Carolina Tar Heels football seasons
North Carolina Tar Heels football